Ademola Nurudeen Jackson Adeleke (born 13 May 1960) is a Nigerian politician and businessman, who has served as governor of Osun State since 2022. He was the senator that represented the Osun-west senatorial district from 2017 to 2019. 

He is from the Adeleke family of Ede in Osun State. He contested in the 2022 Osun State gubernatorial election under the platform of the Peoples Democratic Party and defeated  incumbent governor, Adegboyega Isiaka Oyetola of the APC who defeated him in the 2018 Osun State gubernatorial election rerun.

Education 
Adeleke commenced his primary education at Methodist Primary School, Surulere Lagos State then relocated to Old Oyo State and attended Nawarudeen Primary School, Ikire. He progressed to The Seventh Day Adventist Secondary School, Ede also in the then Old Oyo State and later moved to Ede Muslim Grammar School Ede, where he finished his secondary school education before relocating to the United States. As he left Nigeria to continue his studies joining his two other elder brothers in the United States of America. He started higher studies at Jacksonville State University, Alabama in the United States where he majored in criminal justice and with minor in political science. After much controversies surrounding his educational qualification, he went back to school and got enrolled at Atlanta Metropolitan State College in the United States, where he obtained a Bachelor of Science degree in criminal justice in 2021.

Career

Private sector
Adeleke is a businessman and administrator; he served as an executive director of Guinness Nigeria Plc from 1992–1999, where his co-directors included General Theophilus Danjuma; he was the group executive director at his brother's company, Pacific Holdings Limited from 2001 to 2016. Prior to joining Pacific Holdings Limited, Ademola had worked with Quicksilver Courier Company in Atlanta, Georgia, US, as a service contractor in 1985–1989.
He progressed to Origin International LLC, Atlanta, Georgia, US, a flavours and fragrance manufacturing company as vice president from 1990 to 1994.

Politics
Adeleke is a community member and philanthropist. 
 Adeleke started his political career in 2001 alongside his late brother Senator Isiaka Adeleke who died in April 2017. He contested at the Osun west 2017 by-election after the death of his brother, emerging as the winner under the People's Democratic Party.

Ademola was a member under the All Progressives Congress until he decamped to the People's Democratic Party in April 2017

On 23 July 2018, Adeleke emerged as the governorship candidate of PDP in Osun State after defeating Akin Ogunbiyi by seven votes.

Certificate scandal
Adeleke was  accused and charged to the Osogbo high court for forging his secondary school testimonial and WAEC result to cancel his governorship candidacy.
The testimonial Adeleke submitted to INEC dated 20 July 1988, as its Heading Ede Muslim Grammar School, Osun State, as at that year Osun state was not in existence. Also the SSCE results indicated in the testimonial shows that the mode of examination wasn't existing in the year 1981
Another testimonial with the Heading Ede Muslim High school dated 2018, indicates that the principal which signed the 1988 testimonial also signed the 2018 testimonial, this led to the arrest of the principal by the.
Adeleke's lawyer in his defense claims his secondary school hasn't come out to deny his testimonial asking the court to dismiss the Case. The court dismissed the suit stating that the plaintiff could not prove Adeleke's forgery. Witnesses told court that they didn't see Adeleke in the examination hall. One of the witnesses said he would have recognised him since he is a public figure.

Governorship race 
Adeleke ran for Osun state governorship election under the PDP against top contenders Alhaji Gboyega Oyetola of APC and Iyiola Omisore of SDP on 22 September 2018. The election was declared inconclusive by the Independent Electoral Commission (INEC) and a rerun slated on 27 September 2018. The candidate of the APC Oyetola was declared winner after the run-off. Adeleke protested the result describing the election as a "coup".

On 22 March 2019 the tribunal sitting in Abuja declared Adeleke the winner of the election.

The Supreme Court later affirmed Gboyega Oyetola as the authentic winner of the 2018 Osun State governorship election on Friday, 5 July 2019

In 2022, Adeleke contested in the gubernatorial election of 16 July under the PDP against incumbent governor Gboyega Oyetola. Adeleke defeated Gboyega Oyetola with 402,979 votes to 375,077 votes.
Adeleke won in 17 local government areas, including Olorunda, Ede South, Orolu, Osogbo, Odo Otin, Ifelodun, Boluwaduro, Atakumosa, and Ila.

Personal life
Adeleke is the husband to Titilola Adeleke and he is a father of eight including B-Red, Ayootola, Goke, Sinarambo, Adenike, Folasade, etc. He is also an uncle to musician, Davido.

References

Members of the Senate (Nigeria)
Yoruba politicians
21st-century Nigerian politicians
People from Osun State
Peoples Democratic Party (Nigeria) politicians
Nigerian Muslims
Living people
Nigerian political candidates
Adeleke family
1960 births